Garinish or Garnish Island (also known as Ilnacullin) is an island in Glengarriff Bay, an inlet of Bantry Bay, near the shore of the Beara Peninsula in County Cork, Ireland.  It is a tourist attraction with walled gardens and a Martello tower.

History 

The garden was designed by Harold Peto, (1854–1933), for its owner John Annan Bryce, (1841–1923), a  Belfast native, who purchased the island from the War Office in 1910. Bryce's son Roland bequeathed the island to the Irish nation in 1953. It was taken over and is still maintained by the Office of Public Works. Renowned for its gardens and architecture (a mansion was designed by Peto but was never built), the island has played host to writers including George Bernard Shaw and George William Russell.

There is a restored Martello tower on the island dating from the time of the Napoleonic Wars. The tower, like others in Cork, but unlike other Irish Martello towers, has a straight cylindrical shape that does not splay out at its base.

Mains electricity was brought to the island in the early 1950s via overhead cable.

Gardens

Structures include a clock tower, a Grecian temple, a Martello Tower, and an Italian casita.

Access
Several ferries service the island from the village of Glengarriff. These ferries generally include a tour of the nearby seal colony.

See also
 Historic Cork Gardens

Further reading
 R. Whalley, The Great Edwardian Gardens of Harold Peto (2007)
 Ilnacullin (1989. - National Parks and Monument Service) 
 M. George & P. Bowe, The Gardens of Ireland (1986. Hutchinson)

References

External links

 Official website
 Webpage on Heritage Ireland site
 Visitor guide

Islands of County Cork
Tourist attractions in County Cork
Towers in the Republic of Ireland
Gardens in County Cork
Gardens by Harold Peto